Lewis R. Alderman (1872–1965) worked for multiple education agencies in the U.S. state of Oregon. Born and raised in Dayton He served as Oregon Superintendents from January 4, 1911 to June 28, 1913.

References

1872 births
1965 deaths
Education in Oregon
People from Dayton, Oregon